The Church of the Visitation of the Virgin Mary is a Roman Catholic church in Nitra, Slovakia.

It was first built as a Gothic church in the 14th century. It was rebuilt in the Renaissance style in the first third of the 17th century and was then changed again to the Gothic style in the 18th century.

In the interior there are Gothic architectonic details, Renaissance paintings (by Podmanicky), and a Baroque sculptural group from the cemetery chapel. In front of the church is the statue of the Virgin Mary.

Roman Catholic churches in Slovakia
Churches in Nitra